Tom Nickalls (1827–1899), British stockjobber, father of Guy and Vivian Nickalls
Guy Nickalls (1866–1935), British rower who competed in the 1908 Olympics
Vivian Nickalls (1871–1947), British rower
Silver Goblets & Nickalls' Challenge Cup, rowing event for men's coxless pairs at the annual Henley Royal
Guy Oliver Nickalls (1899–1974), British rower who competed in the 1920 and 1928 Olympics, son of Guy Nickalls
Patteson Nickalls (c.1836–1910), British stockbroker and politician, father of Cecil and Womersley Nickalls
Cecil Patteson Nickalls (1877–1925), British polo and rugby player
Patteson Womersley Nickalls (1877–1946), British polo player